Rodolfo Filemon de Oliveira da Silva (born 29 August 1994), known as Rodolfo Filemon or simply Rodolfo, is a Brazilian footballer who plays for Operário Ferroviário, on loan from CSA, as a central defender.

Club career
Born in São Simão, São Paulo, Rodolfo joined Juventus from São Carlos in 2014. He made his senior debut on 19 July of that year, starting in a 0–0 Copa Paulista away draw against Santo André.

In December 2016, after two short loan stints at Grêmio Prudente, Rodolfo was presented at URT, making his senior debut the following 29 January by starting in a 1–0 Campeonato Mineiro home win against Caldense. After featuring in all matches of the tournament, he signed for Santos on 25 May, being initially assigned to the B-team.

On 9 January 2018, Rodolfo returned to his former side URT on loan. On 24 May, he joined Confiança on a permanent contract, after his deal with Santos expired.

In January 2019, Rodolfo joined Série B side Paraná. On 7 January of the following year, after being a regular starter for the club, he agreed to a three-year deal with Coritiba, newly-promoted to the Série A.

Career statistics

References

External links

1994 births
Living people
Footballers from São Paulo (state)
Brazilian footballers
Association football defenders
Campeonato Brasileiro Série A players
Campeonato Brasileiro Série B players
Campeonato Brasileiro Série C players
Campeonato Brasileiro Série D players
Clube Atlético Juventus players
União Recreativa dos Trabalhadores players
Santos FC players
Associação Desportiva Confiança players
Paraná Clube players
Coritiba Foot Ball Club players
Centro Sportivo Alagoano players